Robert Grace is an Irish singer-songwriter from County Kilkenny, signed to Sony Records.

Biography

Early life
Born in Kilkenny, Grace was raised in a musical household where his father played traditional Irish music with local bands Drop the Penny and the Keltic Kats Pp.

Music career
He had released the singles Boomerang, Golden and Wanna love which gained airplay across Irish radio.  In August 2020 his single Fake Fine entered the Irish charts, peaking at number 20 on the singles chart and 1 on the Irish Homegrown Top 20.

Discography

Extended plays

Singles

References

Living people
Irish  male singer-songwriters
People from County Kilkenny
21st-century Irish male  singers
Year of birth missing (living people)